The 119th (Algoma) Battalion, CEF was a unit in the Canadian Expeditionary Force during the First World War.

History 
Based in Sault Ste. Marie, Ontario, the unit began recruiting in late 1915 in the Algoma District and on Manitoulin Island. After sailing to England in August 1916, the battalion was absorbed into the 8th Reserve Battalion on April 16, 1918. The 119th (Algoma) Battalion, CEF had one Officer Commanding: Lieut-Col. T. P. T. Rowland.

References 
Meek, John F. Over the Top! The Canadian Infantry in the First World War. Orangeville, Ont.: The Author, 1971.

External links 

Lieut-Col T.P.T. Rowland "Officers' Declaration Paper"

Battalions of the Canadian Expeditionary Force
Military units and formations established in 1915
Military units and formations disestablished in 1918
1915 establishments in Ontario